Sean J. Morrison is a Canadian-American stem cell biologist and cancer researcher. Morrison is the director of Children's Medical Center Research Institute at UT Southwestern, a nonprofit research institute established in 2011 as a joint venture between Children’s Health System of Texas and UT Southwestern Medical Center. The CRI was established in 2011 by Morrison with the mission to perform transformative biomedical research at the interface of stem cell biology, cancer, and metabolism to better understand the biological basis of disease. He is a Howard Hughes Medical Institute Investigator  and member of the National Academy of Medicine. From 2015 to 2016 Morrison served as the president of the International Society for Stem Cell Research.

Morrison’s research group studies the mechanisms that regulate stem cell function in adult tissues and the ways in which cancer cells hijack those mechanisms to enable tumor formation.

Education and awards 
Morrison attend Dalhousie University and graduated with a BSc in biology and chemistry in 1991. He earned his Ph.D. in immunology in 1996 for working on the isolation and characterization of blood-forming (hematopoietic) stem cells in the laboratory of Dr. Irving L. Weissman at Stanford University. Morrison then worked as a postdoctoral fellow on the isolation and characterization of neural crest stem cells in Dr. David Anderson’s laboratory at the California Institute of Technology from 1996 to 1999. From 1999 to 2011, he was a professor at the University of Michigan, where he founded their Center for Stem Cell Biology.

Morrison was a Searle Scholar (2000-2003), and received the Presidential Early Career Award for Scientists and Engineers (2003), the International Society for Hematology and Stem Cells McCulloch and Till Award (2007), the American Association of Anatomists Harland Mossman Award (2008), and a MERIT Award from the National Institute on Aging (2009). He was elected to the National Academy of Medicine in 2018.

Research 
The regulation of stem cell self-renewal

Morrison developed methods to distinguish self-renewing stem cells from multipotent progenitors in the blood-forming system and in the peripheral and central nervous systems. This work showed that self-renewal potential is determined cell-intrinsically in stem cells and made it possible to identify gene products that regulate stem cell maintenance across multiple tissues. The Morrison laboratory identified a series of key stem cell self-renewal regulators, revealing several important principles. First, stem cell self-renewal is mechanistically distinct from restricted progenitor proliferation. Second, many self-renewal mechanisms are conserved among stem cells in different tissues. Third, these mechanisms comprise networks of proto-oncogenes and tumor suppressors that are dysregulated in cancer; cancer cells tend to hijack stem cell self-renewal mechanisms to enable tumorigenesis. Fourth, the Morrison laboratory showed that these networks change over time, conferring temporal changes in stem cell properties that match the changing growth and regeneration demands of tissues (for example during fetal development and adulthood). Fifth, tumor suppressor expression increases with age in stem cells, suppressing the development of cancer but also reducing stem cell function and tissue regenerative capacity during aging.

Identification of the hematopoietic stem cell niche

The Morrison laboratory also identified cell-extrinsic mechanisms by which the niche (a specialized microenvironment that maintains stem cells in tissues) regulates the maintenance of blood-forming stem cells in adult blood-forming tissues. They were the first to propose that hematopoietic stem cells (HSCs) reside in perivascular niches after discovering SLAM family markers that enabled the localization of HSCs in hematopoietic tissues. They showed in that study that most HSCs reside adjacent to sinusoidal blood vessels in the bone marrow and spleen. They showed that endothelial cells and Leptin Receptor+ perivascular stromal cells are the major sources of factors required for HSC maintenance in the bone marrow. The Leptin Receptor+ cells include skeletal stem cells that are a major source of new bone cells and adipocytes that form in adult bone marrow. The identification of these niche cells made it possible to test whether hematopoiesis or osteogenesis are regulated by yet undiscovered growth factors in the bone marrow. As a result of this work, the Morrison lab discovered Osteolectin/Clec11a, a bone-forming growth factor made by Leptin Receptor+ cells that is required to maintain the adult skeleton by promoting osteogenesis.

Cancer cell self-replication and metastasis

The Morrison laboratory also compared the self-renewal of stem cells to the self-replication of cancer cells. They showed that tumorigenic cells are abundant in some cancers and that cancer cells experience a dramatic increase in reactive oxygen species during metastasis, leading to the death of most metastasizing cells. This discovery raises the possibility that “pro-oxidant” therapies that increase oxidative stress in cancer cells might inhibit cancer progression, an area of active investigation within the Morrison laboratory.

Advocacy 
Morrison has been active in shaping public policy related to stem cell research. He testified before the U.S. Congress, served as a leader in the successful “Proposal 2” campaign to protect and regulate stem cell research in Michigan’s state constitution , and chairs the public policy committee for the International Society for Stem Cell Research.

References

External links
Sean J. Morrison, Ph.D.
Children's Medical Center Research Institute at UT Southwestern
Sean Morrison's Short Talk: "Stem Cell Politics"

Life Sciences Institute, University of Michigan
University of Michigan faculty
Stanford University School of Medicine alumni
Living people
Howard Hughes Medical Investigators
Year of birth missing (living people)
Members of the National Academy of Medicine